Miss Julie is an opera by Ned Rorem to an English libretto by Kenward Elmslie, based on the play, Miss Julie (1888), by Swedish playwright August Strindberg. It explores the subject of the intersection of social class and illicit sexual relations in late 19th-century Sweden.

Performance history

The opera was commissioned by the New York City Opera, and had its first performance there on 4 November 1965, in its original two-hour, two-act version. The production was conducted by Robert Zeller and directed by Nikos Psacharopoulos, with scenic and lighting design by Will Steven Armstrong, costume design by Patton Campbell, and choreography by Thomas Andrew. The opera was not a critical success. 

Rorem revised the score and shortened it to a single act in 1978; this version lasts 90 minutes and was first performed that same year by the New York Lyric Opera. The one-act version underwent further slight revisions and was produced again in 1994 by the Manhattan School of Music Opera Theatre. This version was praised by James Oestreich, music critic of The New York Times, as "taut and persuasive musical drama". It was recorded and released on the Newport Classic label. Another recording, of a production on 7 November 2003 by the Curtis Opera Theatre, has been released on Albany Records.

Roles

Instrumentation
The orchestra consists of: 2 flutes, 2 oboes, 2 clarinets, 2 bassoons, 3 horns, 2 trumpets, 2 trombones, timpani, 2 additional percussion players (xylophone, slapstick, gong, triangle, vibraphone, tambourine, cymbals, tenor drum, glockenspiel, castanets, chimes, suspended cymbal, bongos), guitar, harp, strings.

Synopsis
Place: the servants' quarters of a country estate in Sweden.
Time: a Midsummer Eve celebration in the 1880s.

Miss Julie, the jaded daughter of the Count, orders her fiancé Niels to kiss her boot. He breaks off their engagement in disgust. Later that evening John, the valet, and his fiancée Christine, the cook, sit with Miss Julie. She flirts with John, who eventually admits he has loved her since boyhood. On the following day John and Miss Julie discuss how they will spend their lives together, and John expresses his desire to go to Lake Como to make his living running a hotel. When Miss Julie admits she has no money of her own to finance such an undertaking, John demands she somehow find some, so Miss Julie steals money from the Count. Meanwhile, Christine discovers John's intentions and threatens to quit her job with the Count. The lovers prepare to escape, but Miss Julie demands to take her canary with her. Angered, John kills the bird. She grabs his razor and threatens to slit her wrists, and he suggests she go ahead and do it. The Count rings for John, and he leaves, as Julie goes slowly into the garden and follows his suggestion.

References

External links
 Scoring, synopsis and audio sample: Boosey & Hawkes
 Review: "OPERA REVIEW; 'Miss Julie,' to Rorem's Music", New York Times, 9 Dec 1994

1965 operas
Operas based on works by August Strindberg
English-language operas
Opera world premieres at New York City Opera
Operas
One-act operas
Operas by Ned Rorem
Operas based on plays
Operas set in Sweden
1978 operas
Works based on Miss Julie